John Franklin Pike (1861 – 25 February 1919) was a British sport shooter. Competing for Great Britain, he won a gold medal in team trap shooting at the 1908 Summer Olympics in London.

References

1861 births
1919 deaths
British male sport shooters
Olympic shooters of Great Britain
Olympic gold medallists for Great Britain
Shooters at the 1908 Summer Olympics
Medalists at the 1908 Summer Olympics
Place of birth missing
Olympic medalists in shooting
20th-century British people